Animal Jam Classic, formerly known as Animal Jam, is a massively multiplayer online game that is developed by WildWorks and recommended for kids up to the age of 12. It was launched in 2010, in collaboration with the National Geographic Society.

In Animal Jam Classic, players can discover various facts about zoology using the game's numerous features, including mini-games, puzzles, adventures, parties, and social interactions. Due to its rapid growth, Animal Jam Classic has spawned different types of merchandise, including figurine toys, books, board games, and a subscription box.

Although Animal Jam Classic is primarily played on PC, the Animal Jam Classic universe has been expanded to incorporate most mobile devices such as smartphones, tablets, and iOS devices. The most popular Animal Jam Classic mobile app spin-off is Animal Jam, previously known as Animal Jam - Play Wild!, which is a 3D version of the Animal Jam Classic world. WildWorks has also developed other apps that are based on the Animal Jam Classic game including Tunnel Town, AJ Jump, and Dash Tag.

In May 2020, in an event dubbed the "aMAYzing Migration", WildWorks rebranded the desktop game from Animal Jam to Animal Jam Classic; as part of the event, the app that was formerly known as Animal Jam – Play Wild! was rebranded to Animal Jam.

 Development Animal Jam Classic was developed by WildWorks (formerly Smart Bomb Interactive) and it was launched on September 9, 2010. In 2011, Animal Jam Classic had over 1 million registered players in the game. Later, in March 2013, the game achieved over 10 million players, a milestone which was made known to all of the players in the game itself. Since then, Animal Jam Classic's player count had grown rapidly with the game having over 100 million players as of late 2018. As of 2021, Animal Jam Classic is not available to play without the desktop app, due to the discontinuation of Adobe Flash Player.

 Gameplay environment Animal Jam Classic takes place in an area known as Jamaa, with various different biomes and customizable animals. New players can create an animal with a name that is composed of three simple words. From that point, players can customize and move around with it in the gameplay environment. The original 6 virtual animals that could be created were the Bunny, Monkey, Wolf, Tiger, Panda, and Koala, though many more animals have been added.

Players can customize their own dens (virtual houses) with furniture, chat with other players, adopt pets, play mini-games, purchase in-game clothing and furniture with currency, trade items, attend parties, and go on various RPG-style adventures. There is a subscription-like membership feature available on the site that costs real money and lets players access certain exclusive in-game features.

 Communication and safety Animal Jam Classic contains three versions of in-game chat, which offers various levels of restriction. Bubble Chat restricts players from typing messages but will allow them to select predefined words and phrases in a list. Safe Chat, the default setting, allows players to type words or phrases in a particular list which only the game permits, similar to a whitelist. Safe Chat Plus, which was previously available only to members but is now available for all players, allows players to type any word or phrase while being run through the game's safe chat filter. Parents can control players’ chat settings from the site's parent dashboard. One player can report or block another player for unacceptable, intolerable, or inappropriate behavior. If a player is found chatting in an inappropriate way, the player may have their chat temporarily muted or even be suspended from logging on for a long period.Animal Jam Classic is free from outside advertising and adheres to a strict privacy policy.

 Educational elements 
In addition to in-game nature facts and activities, Animal Jam Classic provides educational video content featuring herpetologist Brady Barr and marine biologist Tierney Thys. Furthermore, there are certain events and activities that help raise awareness for environmental problems.

 Other media 

 Merchandise Animal Jam Classic shirts, stuffed animals, hats, in-game currency, books, and toys are sold on the Animal Jam Outfitters site.

In 2013, WildWorks partnered with Sidekix to produce a set of eight stuffed animals modeled after the Animal Jam Classic avatars that can be "flipped" into a ball. In October 2015, the company named Jazwares as the main toy partner for the Animal Jam Classic brand. Jazwares began developing figures, playsets, and plush items which were launched internationally in 2016.

In June 2016, WildWorks released Animal Jam Classic toys which consisted mainly of stuffed animals, figures, and toy sets. One of which is a series of toys called "Animal Jam Adopt-a-Pet" which comes with a miniature figure of a pet from the game and two accessories in a den shaped box, along with an in-game item code. Since the release, four series of toys have been released so far, featuring different pets, accessories, and dens.

On November 16, 2016, WildWorks launched "Animal Jam Box", a subscription box that contains merchandise sent to those who would subscribe to the plan.

In early 2019, WildWorks' contract with Jazwares had ended, and the company could no longer make merchandise with the company. However, the subscription box is no longer available as of spring 2020.Pillow Pets based on Animal Jam Classic in-game avatars are sold on the Pillow Pets official website, and on various online stores and Amazon.
 Animal Jam Academy Animal Jam Academy is a program that is directly linked to the Animal Jam Classic website. It provides users with "how-to" projects using the themes of science, technology, engineering, and art.

 Mobile apps 
 Animal Jam

The most popular mobile application by WildWorks is Animal Jam, formerly known as Animal Jam - Play Wild!, which is a 3D version of the Animal Jam Classic universe and was released in August 2015.

In February 2016, WildWorks had announced that Animal Jam had reached over 1 million downloads. The app is the top downloaded iPad educational game in 24 countries, the top downloaded game for 11 in 35 countries in 2018, and top-grossing iPad game in 54 countries. On May 19, 2017, Animal Jam won the Google Play Awards 2017 for Best Kids' App.

In early 2020, a version of ‘’Animal Jam’’ was released for personal computers, allowing players to play on Windows and macOS.

 Other apps 
On July 18, 2013, a free Animal Jam Classic-based city-building mobile game called Tunnel Town was released on the iOS and Android. In Tunnel Town, players raise a bunny family underground by purchasing, looking after, and raising new rabbit species.

Later, in 2013, a second Animal Jam Classic mobile game spin-off was available for purchase, which was titled AJ Jump. The game is centered on kangaroos, with a similar gameplay format to Doodle Jump.

In 2018, a third game was released, titled Dash Tag. In Dash Tag, the player collects various animals and attempts to evade capture from a character named Misha the Panda. The gameplay is an endless runner game, similar to Subway Surfers and Temple Run.

 Donations 

The Gem donation box, which is in the game's Conservation Museum, is a way Animal Jam Classic encourages players to be more aware of the environment. A significant portion of all revenue Animal Jam Classic collected went to support worldwide conservation efforts. By June 2012, players enabled the Animal Jam Classic developers at WildWorks to contribute over $3 million to the National Geographic Society's work. The Play Wild Fund was introduced in November 2011 to allow other players to choose which animals and conservation efforts they wanted to donate to Animal Jam. In 2014, Animal Jam Classic raised $200 million for charity.

 Reception Animal Jam Classic has received relatively positive reviews, with some criticism towards flawed moderation and strict limitations on accounts. Common Sense Media reviewer Dana Anderson gave Animal Jam Classic a 3-star rating, saying that the site was most appropriate for ages ten and over due to "unmonitored chat." Gamezebo reviewer Nick Tylwalk gave the site a 4-star review, which stated, "There's something for animal lovers over a load range of ages."

Jenna Glatzer on The Washington Post'' described problematic social interactions on the game, including cyberbullying, scams for virtual items, and cybersex. Natalie Shahmiri, WildWorks' Vice President of Marketing, provided a statement in the article on how the staff are aware of these problems and working to close moderation loopholes that allow such interactions to happen.

Awards

References

External links 
 Official website for Animal Jam Classic
 Official website for Animal Jam
2010 video games
Browser games
Children's educational video games
American children's websites
Fantasy massively multiplayer online role-playing games
Flash games
Massively multiplayer online games
National Geographic Society
Video games about animals
Video games adapted into comics
Video games developed in the United States